Cystopteris is a genus of ferns in the family Cystopteridaceae. These are known generally as bladderferns or fragile ferns. They grow in temperate areas worldwide. This is a very diverse genus and within a species individuals can look quite different, especially in harsh environments where stress stunts their growth. They hybridize easily with each other and identifying an individual can be challenging. In general these are rhizomatous perennials which grow in rocks or soil. Their leaves are multiply pinnate, in that each leaflet is divided into smaller parts. The sori are usually rounded and covered in an inflated bladder-like indusium.

Species
Species include:
Cystopteris alpina
Cystopteris bulbifera - bulblet fern
Cystopteris chinensis (Ching) R.Wei & X.C.Zhang (syn. Cystoathyrium chinense Ching)
Cystopteris diaphana
Cystopteris dickieana - Dickie's bladderfern
Cystopteris douglasii - Douglas' bladderfern
Cystopteris fragilis - brittle bladderfern
Cystopteris laurentiana - St. Lawrence bladderfern
Cystopteris montana - mountain bladderfern
Cystopteris protrusa - lowland bladderfern
Cystopteris reevesiana - Reeves' bladderfern
Cystopteris tennesseensis - Tennessee bladderfern
Cystopteris tenuis - upland brittle fern
Cystopteris utahensis - Utah bladderfern

Hybrids
Cystopteris widely hybridizes internally. Its diploid parent species include:

C. bulbifera
C. "hemifragilis" (an undiscovered or extinct diploid)
C. protrusa
C. reevesiana

The hybrid species include:

C. fragilis (C. "hemifragilis" × C. reevesiana; allotetraploid)
C. laurentiana (C. bulbifera × C. fragilis; allohexaploid)
C. tennesseensis (C. bulbifera × C. protrusa; allotetraploid)
C. tenuis (C. "hemifragilis" × C. protrusa; allotetraploid)
C. utahensis (C. reevesiana × C. bulbifera; allotetraploid)

Non-species hybrids include:

Cystopteris × illinoensis (C. bulbifera × C. tenuis; allotriploid)
Cystopteris × wagneri (C. tennesseensis × C. tenuis; allo-allotetraploid)
Cystopteris fragilis × Cystopteris tenuis (allo-allotetraploid)
Cystopteris protrusa × Cystopteris tennesseensis (allotriploid)

References

Lellinger, David B. A Field Manual of the Ferns & Fern-Allies of the United States & Canada. Smithsonian Institution, Washington, DC. 1985.

External links
Jepson Manual Treatment
USDA Plants Profile
Flora of North America

 
Polypodiales
Fern genera